Louis Thomas Possehl (April 12, 1926 – October 7, 1997) was an American professional baseball player. A right-handed pitcher, he played in parts of five Major League seasons for the Philadelphia Phillies (1946–48; 1951–52).

Possehl appeared in 15 Major League games, eight as a starting pitcher. In 51 innings pitched, he surrendered 62 hits and 24 bases on balls, with 22 strikeouts. In his only complete game, on September 20, 1948, he defeated the Pittsburgh Pirates 7–4 at Shibe Park, allowing eight hits and four walks.

References

External links

1926 births
1997 deaths
Baltimore Orioles (IL) players
Baseball players from Chicago
Kansas City Blues (baseball) players
Major League Baseball pitchers
Philadelphia Phillies players
Terre Haute Phillies players
Toronto Maple Leafs (International League) players
Utica Blue Sox players